Mali i Mesit is a mountain peak in the south of Albania and in the north of Greece. Mali i Mesit, which means 'Middle Peak' in English is, a peak in the mountain of Gramos. It is also a place were Albanians used to travel to and from Greece.

Mountains of Albania